Jacob Hostetter (May 9, 1754June 29, 1831) was a member of the U.S. House of Representatives from Pennsylvania.

Biography
Jacob Hostetter was born near York in the Province of Pennsylvania.  He attended the common schools and worked as a clockmaker.  He was a member of the general assembly of Pennsylvania from 1797 to 1802.  He was elected as a Republican to the Fifteenth Congress to fill the vacancy caused by the resignation of Jacob Spangler.  He was reelected as a Republican to the Sixteenth Congress.  He moved to Ohio and settled in Columbiana, Ohio, where he died on June 29, 1831.

Sources

The Political Graveyard

1754 births
1831 deaths
American clockmakers
Members of the Pennsylvania House of Representatives
Politicians from York, Pennsylvania
People from Columbiana, Ohio
Democratic-Republican Party members of the United States House of Representatives from Pennsylvania